Pauktaw Township is a township of Sittwe District in the Rakhine State of Myanmar. The principal town is Pauktaw.

Townships of Rakhine State
Sittwe